This is a list of the heads of state of Uganda, from the independence of Uganda in 1962 to the present day.

From 1962 to 1963, the head of state under the Constitution of 1962 was the Queen of Uganda, Elizabeth II, who was also the Queen of the United Kingdom and the other Commonwealth realms. The queen was represented in Uganda by a governor-general. Uganda became a republic within the Commonwealth under a 1963 constitutional amendment and the monarch and governor-general were replaced by a ceremonial president, which was replaced by an executive presidency in 1966.

Monarchy (1962–1963)
The succession to the throne was the same as the succession to the British throne.

Governor-general
The governor-general was the representative of the monarch in Uganda and exercised most of the powers of the monarch. The governor-general was appointed for an indefinite term, serving at the pleasure of the monarch. Since Uganda was granted independence by the Uganda Independence Act 1962, rather than being first established as a semi-autonomous dominion and later promoted to independence as defined by the Statute of Westminster 1931, the governor-general was to be always appointed solely on the advice of the Cabinet of Uganda without the involvement of the British government. As Uganda became a republic before Walter Coutts, the former colonial governor, was replaced, this has never happened. In the event of a vacancy the chief justice would have served as the officer administering the government.

Status

First Republic (1963–1971)

Under the 1963 constitutional amendment establishing the Republic of Uganda, the president replaced the monarch as ceremonial head of state. The president and vice-president were elected by the National Assembly for a five-year term from among the traditional rulers and constitutional heads of districts.

In 1966, the powers of the president were increased, with the establishment of the executive presidency, but the same rules applied concerning the vacancy of the president. It also applied to the 1967 and 1995 constitutions.

Status

Second Republic (1971–1979)

General (later field marshal) Idi Amin led a coup d'état that overthrew President Obote and his government and installed himself as president.

Third Republic (1979–1985)

Military rule (1985–1986)
General Bazilio Olara-Okello led a coup d'état that overthrew President Obote and his government. Following the coup, Okello proclaimed himself president.

Fourth Republic (1986–present)
Under the Constitution of Uganda, the president is the executive head of state. The president is elected by popular vote for a five-year term. In the event of a vacancy, the vice president serves as acting president.

Status

Timeline

References

External links
 World Statesmen – Uganda
 Rulers.org – Uganda

Government of Uganda
H